Brigham Young (1801–1877) was an American colonizer and president of The Church of Jesus Christ of Latter-day Saints (LDS Church). 

Brigham Young may also refer to:

People
Brigham Young, Jr. (1836–1903), American Mormon missionary and leader in the LDS Church
Brigham Morris Young (1854–1931), another son of Brigham Young

Landmarks
Brigham Young Complex, a U.S. National Historic Landmark in Salt Lake City, Utah
 Brigham Young Monument

Universities
Brigham Young University, a university in Provo, Utah owned by the LDS Church
Brigham Young University–Hawaii, a university in Laie, Hawaii owned by the LDS Church
Brigham Young University–Idaho, a university in Rexburg, Idaho owned by the LDS Church

Art, entertainment, and media
Brigham Young (film), a 1940 American film
Brigham Young: American Moses, a 1985 biography by Leonard J. Arrington
 Brigham Young (Mahonri Young statue)

Young, Brigham